This list of University of Cape Town faculty includes current, emeritus, former, and deceased professors, lecturers, and researchers. Faculty members who have become Institute Professors, or have earned other significant awards and made significant contributions are listed below.

Commerce 
 William Harold Hutt, professor of Commerce and originator of the term "Consumer Surplus".
 Francis Wilson, founded and was the director of the Southern African Labour and Development Research Unit (SALDRU)

Engineering & the Built Environment

 Jo Noero, Director of the School of Architecture and Planning
 Alphose Zingoni, professor of structural engineering and mechanic
 George Ekama, Emeritus Professor of Water Quality Engineering. Order of Mapungubwe Silver (OMS) (2013)
 Alison Lewis, Director of Crystallisation and Precipitation Research Unit

Health Sciences
 Frances Ames, Neurologist, psychiatrist, human rights activist. She earned her MD degree in 1964 from UCT, the first woman to do so. Led medical ethics inquiry into death of Steve Biko who died in 1977. Awarded Star of Africa, SA’s highest civilian honour.
Christiaan Neethling Barnard, head surgeon of the medical team who performed the world's first successful human-to-human heart transplant.
Eric Crichton, one of the three original members of the medical faculty
Tania Douglas, professor of biomedical engineering 
 Bongani Mayosi (b. 1967 – d. 2018) cardiology professor, the Order of Mapungubwe (Silver), Dean of the Faculty of Health Sciences.
 Valerie Mizrahi, Director of the University's Institute of Infectious Disease and Molecular Medicine.  TB researcher that received the Order of Mapungubwe (silver) in 2007 for her contributions to "biochemistry and molecular biology, including TB drug validation".
Elmi Muller from the Department of Surgery performed the first kidney transplant from a HIV-positive donor to a HIV-positive recipient.
 Hamilton Naki, a laboratory assistant to cardiac surgeon Christiaan Barnard
 Timothy Noakes, controversial professor of exercise and sports science and author of several books on endurance sports and, recently, diet.  Awarded the Order of Mapungubwe (silver) in 2007 for his contributions to the science of physical exercise.
 Keertan Dheda, professor of medicine.

Humanities
Lydia Baumbach (1924-1991), classicist. 
 David Benatar, philosopher and author.
 David H. M. Brooks (1950–1996), author of On living in an Unjust Society and The Unity of the Mind.
 Martin Hall, Professor of Historical Archaeology, deputy vice-chancellor (2002 to 2008)
Mahmood Mamdani, inaugural holder of the AC Jordan chair of African studies (1996 to 1998). 
 Hendrik W. (H.W.) van der Merwe, founder of the Centre for Intergroup Studies 1968, emeritus professor 1992.
 Charles Villa-Vicencio is an Emeritus Professor of Religious Studies, Truth and Reconciliation Commission
 Monica Wilson, (1908 - 26 October 1982) was a South African anthropologist, professor of social anthropology.

Languages and Literatures
 Breyten Breytenbach, visiting professor in the Graduate School of Humanities from January 2000, author
 André Brink, professor in the English Language and Literature Department, author
 J. M. Coetzee, emeritus Professor of General Literature, 2003 Nobel Prize in Literature
 Harry Garuba (1958-2020), African Studies and English professor
 Joan Hambidge, professor at the School of Languages and Literature, author
 Etienne van Heerden, Hofmeyr Professor at the School of Languages and Literatures
 David Wardle, professor in the School of Languages and Literatures.

History 
 Eric A. Walker (1886-1976), British historian, King George V Professor of History at the University of Cape Town and Professor Emeritus of Imperial History at the University of Cambridge
 Nigel Worden, historian of slavery in South Africa and Cape Town.

Psychology
 Mark Solms, professor in neuropsychology and neuropsychoanalysis.
 Floretta Boonzaier, professor of psychology

Law
Pierre de Vos, constitutional law scholar.

Sciences
 Anusuya Chinsamy-Turan, vertebrate paleontologist
John H. Day, after whom the John H. Day Building on Upper Campus is named, was a marine biologist and invertebrate zoologist noted for his study on the taxonomy of Polychaete and estuaries.
 George Ellis, collaborator with Stephen Hawking and winner of the 2004 Templeton Prize, Distinguished Professor of Complex Systems in the Department of Mathematics and Applied Mathematics.
 Reginald W. James, physicist, Vice Chancellor and Antarctic explorer. 
 Henry Harold Welch Pearson (28 January 1870 - 3 November 1916), Chair of Botany (UCT), Fellow of the Royal Society 1916, Fellow of the Linnean Society of London
 Daya Reddy, Research Chair in Computational and Applied Mechanics, Department of Mathematics and Applied Mathematics
 Basil Schonland, Professor of Physics
 Judith Sealy, Professor and South Africa Research Chairs Initiative Research Chair in Archaeology and Paleoenvironmental Studies
 Brian Warner, astronomer, Emeritus Distinguished Professor of Natural Philosophy

Staff
 Mamphela Ramphele, The first black female Vice Chancellor at UCT and SA Universities. One of four managing directors at the World Bank and first South African to hold Vice President of External Affairs for World Bank.
 Helen Zille, former Mayor of Cape Town and Premier of the Western Cape, former Director of Public Relations for the university.
Ebrahim Patel, held positions as South African Minister of Trade and Industry and as the Minister of Economic Development, on the University Council of UCT and was former staffer in the Southern African Labour and Development Research Unit in the School of Economics. 
Naledi Pandor, held senior positions in the African National Congress and in the Cabinet of South Africa where she served as the Minister of International Relations and Cooperation. She worked as a senior lecturer in the academic support programme.
 Jo Beall, deputy vice-chancellor (academic, external relations and international) (2009–2011)

References